Boumsong is a surname. Notable people with the surname include:

Daniel Maa Boumsong (born 1987), Cameroonian footballer
Jean-Alain Boumsong (born 1979), Cameroonian-born French footballer
Jean Paul Boumsong (born 1985), Cameroonian footballer
Raphael Boumsong (born 1989), Cameroonian footballer